Stary Sibay (İśke Sibay) is a rural locality (a selo) and the administrative centre of Sibaysky Selsoviet, Baymaksky District, Bashkortostan, Russia. The population was 2,746 as of 2010. There are 48 streets.

Geography 
Stary Sibay is located 32 km northeast of Baymak (the district's administrative centre) by road. Zoloto is the nearest rural locality.

References 

Rural localities in Baymaksky District